Hacienda Xmatkuil is located in the Mérida Municipality in the state of Yucatán in southeastern Mexico. It is one of the properties that arose during the nineteenth century henequen boom. It is part of the Cuxtal Ecological Reserve, which was set aside in 1993 to protect both the artificial and natural history of the reserve area of Mérida.

Since 1974, the former hacienda has served as the site of the Yucatán State Fair and features agricultural events, competitions and fair rides each November.

Toponymy
The name (Xmatkuil) comes from the Mayan language and means "the place where you pray to God".

How to get there
The property is located 10 km south of Mérida on Calle 50.

History

The Hacienda Xmatkuil was originally used for agricultural purposes and during the henequen boom was dedicated to sisal production. In 1974, the former grounds became an exhibition location for the county fair. Initially, the event was limited to showing livestock, industrial equipment, agricultural produce and artisan products, but it quickly expanded with restaurants, competitions in art and sports, and other events to become the largest fair on the Yucatán peninsula.  The current event, which occurs annually on the second weekend of November, includes arts and crafts show, livestock shows, rodeo events, concerts, sporting events, a dog show, and a children's petting zoo. It usually runs through 3 weekends.

On 28 June 1993, the Cuxtal Ecological Reserve was designated to protect the history of the 7 large haciendas, their adjoining pueblas, 12 minor archaeological sites, 6 cenotes and one of Merida's important water supply stations. Hacienda Xmatkuil was part of this historic designation.

Within the reserve are the following protected haciendas:

Hacienda Hunxectamán in the village of Uxec Taman.
Hacienda San Antonio Tahdzibichén.
Hacienda San Ignacio Tesip in the village of Tesip.
Hacienda San Nicolás Dzoyaxché, which contains Cenote Dzonot-Ich on its grounds.  
Hacienda San Pedro Chimay.
Hacienda Santa Cruz Palomeque.
Hacienda Xmatkuil.

Demographics
All of the henequen plantations ceased to exist as autonomous communities with the agrarian land reform implemented by President Lázaro Cárdenas in 1937. His decree turned the haciendas into collective ejidos, leaving only 150 hectares to the former landowners for use as private property. Figures before 1937 indicate populations living on the farm. After 1937, figures indicate those living in the community, as the remaining Hacienda Xmatkuil houses only the owner's immediate family.

According to the 2005 census conducted by the INEGI, the population of the city was 357 inhabitants, of whom 189 were men and 168 were women.

References

Bibliography
 Bracamonte, P and Solís, R., Los espacios de autonomía maya, Ed. UADY, Mérida, 1997.
 Gobierno del Estado de Yucatán, "Los municipios de Yucatán", 1988.
 Kurjack, Edward y Silvia Garza, Atlas arqueológico del Estado de Yucatán, Ed. INAH, 1980.
 Patch, Robert, La formación de las estancias y haciendas en Yucatán durante la colonia, Ed. UADY, 1976.
 Peón Ancona, J. F., "Las antiguas haciendas de Yucatán", en Diario de Yucatán, Mérida, 1971.

External links
 Hacienda Santa Cruz Hotel

Photo gallery

Populated places in Yucatán
Haciendas of Yucatán
Agave production